Ver-o-peso market is a market hall in Belém, Brazil located at Guajará Bay riverside.

It is called "Ver-o-Peso" following a colonial era tradition, since the tax collector's main post was located there, which was called "Casa do Haver-o-peso" ("Have-the-Weight House"). It was in the "Haver-o-peso house" that the taxes over goods brought from the Amazon forests, rivers and countryside should be paid to the Portuguese crown, but only after their weight was measured, hence the name, which later suffered a contraction.

Nowadays, the Ver-o-peso complex contains the Açaí Fair, a free open market where açaí berry merchants sell the fruit in natura for açaí juice shops, the Clock Square, with an iron-cast clock tower brought from England, the Ver-o-peso docks, where native fishes from Amazon are unloaded from boats and sold fresh, the Iron Market, a gothic prefab structure where fish is sold, the Solar da Beira space, a colonial building where art expositions often take place, and the neoclassical Meat Market, across the street, with iron-cast stairs and cubicles. There's also the free market, where craftsmanship, natural essence parfums, typical food and native fruits are sold.

It is located a few meters away from Feliz Lusitânia complex, a gathering of 16th and 18th century buildings including a fortress, an old hospital transformed into a museum, and two churches: a baroque one where there is a sacred art museum, and Belém's cathedral.

The entire area has been declared national patrimony by the National Historical Museum of Brazil. Ver-o-peso is in a tentative proposition to become part of UNESCO's list of world's human patrimonies.

See also
 Traditional Brazilian medicine

External links
 YouTube: Dirceu Maues: feito poeira ao vento - Pinhole film shot in Ver-o-peso.

References
 http://www.belem.pa.gov.br/new/index.php?option=com_content&view=article&id=4330&Itemid=413

Retail markets in Brazil
Buildings and structures in Pará
Tourist attractions in Pará
Traditional Brazilian medicine